Roberto Muzzi (born 21 September 1971) is an Italian former professional footballer who played as a striker: He works as a "club manager" for Cagliari.

During his career, he played for several Italian clubs including A.S. Roma, Pisa Calcio, Cagliari Calcio, Udinese Calcio, and S.S. Lazio. He was also part of the Italy U-21 team from 1990 to 1994, playing 19 matches and scoring 4 goals under manager Cesare Maldini, and winning the UEFA European Under-21 Championship in 1992 and 1994; he also took part at the 1992 Summer Olympics, although he never received a call-up for the senior Italy side. He was known in particular for his electrifying speed as a forward.

Playing career
Muzzi started his career with A.S. Roma, making his debut in Serie A on 11 February 1990, in a league match against Inter ended in a 1–1 tie, and scoring his first goal the following season. With Roma, he won the Coppa Italia in 1991, also helping his side to reach an all-Italian UEFA Cup Final that season, losing out to Inter, also missing out on the 1991 Supercoppa Italiana, which was won by Sampdoria.

Muzzi was loaned to Serie B club Pisa in November 1993, where he scored 8 goals in 23 games. He then returned to Roma only to be sold in November 1994 to Cagliari, where he then spent four seasons, playing a total 144 games with 31 Serie A goals and 17 in Serie B.

Muzzi joined Udinese during the 1999–2000 season, spending four more seasons with the zebrette; in total, he played 103 games for the club, scoring 39 goals, winning the 2000 UEFA Intertoto Cup, which enabled the Friuli side to qualify for the UEFA Cup the following season. He then returned to Rome to join Lazio for the 2003–04 season; although he was not a regular first-team member, his performances often proved to be decisive on the pitch, as shown by his goal which enabled Lazio to avoid relegation during the 2004–05 season; during his time with the club, he won the 2003–04 Coppa Italia, also reaching the semi-finals of the 2003–04 UEFA Cup, but missed out on the 2004 Supercoppa Italiana to Milan. In September 2005, he joined Serie B side Torino, and was one of the protagonists in the granatas return to the top flight. His second season with Torino, now in Serie A, saw Muzzi scoring only 3 goals.

In September 2006, at the age of 35, and after having turned down a youth coach role at Torino, he agreed a two-year contract with Serie C1's Padova. In October 2008 he announced his retirement from active football.

Coaching and managerial career
After retirement, he joined AS Roma as a youth coach in 2009, serving on a number of different positions within the club until 2015.

He subsequently joined Andrea Stramaccioni's coaching staff at Panathinaikos and AC Sparta Praha. In 2019 he was named as Aurelio Andreazzoli's assistant at Empoli, following the manager also at Genoa.

On 14 November 2019 he took over as head coach of Serie B club Empoli, signing a deal with the Tuscan club till the end of the 2019–20 Serie B season. He was however dismissed on 26 January 2020, following a string of disappointing results during his short tenure at the club.

In July 2020 he accepted an offer to become the new technical director of Eccellenza amateurs Lupa Frascati. A month later, following the club's takeover by the Lupa Frascati owners, he was announced as new youth system chief of then-Serie C club Arezzo. On 5 February 2022, Muzzi was dismissed from his role.

In July 2022, Muzzi agreed to return to Cagliari as a "club manager", with the duty of assisting director of football Stefano Capozucca and dealing with organizational and management matters within the first team squad. On 20 December 2022, following the dismissal of Fabio Liverani, Muzzi was appointed interim head coach. Following the appointment of Claudio Ranieri as new head coach, Muzzi filled in for a single game, a 2–0 win against Cosenza, although he could not serve from the dugout and had to be replaced by Fabio Pisacane due to him being sick.

HonoursRomaCoppa Italia: 1990–91UdineseUEFA Intertoto Cup: 2000LazioCoppa Italia: 2003–04Italy U21'
UEFA European Under-21 Championship: 1992, 1994

References

External links
Profile at La Gazzetta dello Sport

1971 births
Living people
Footballers from Rome
Association football forwards
Italian footballers
Italy youth international footballers
Italy under-21 international footballers
A.S. Roma players
Pisa S.C. players
Cagliari Calcio players
Udinese Calcio players
S.S. Lazio players
Torino F.C. players
Serie A players
Serie B players
Serie C players
Olympic footballers of Italy
Footballers at the 1992 Summer Olympics
Calcio Padova players
Panathinaikos F.C. non-playing staff
Italian expatriates in the Czech Republic
Italian expatriates in Greece
Italian football managers
Empoli F.C. managers
Serie B managers